Devil's Bridge (lit. "The bridge on the Mynach") is a village and community in Ceredigion, Wales. Above the River Mynach on the edge of the village is the unusual road bridge from which the village gets its English name.

The population of Pontarfynach community at the 2011 census was 455. The mid-2016 estimate suggests that the population had dropped slightly to 429.

History 
The village is best known for the bridge that spans the Afon Mynach, a tributary of the Rheidol. The bridge is unique in that three separate bridges are coexistent, each one built upon the previous bridge. The previous structures were not demolished.

The most recently built, in 1901, is an iron bridge which was erected above the older arches. The original bridge is medieval and the second one, a stone structure, built in 1753 and upgraded in 1777 and in 1814, was erected when the original bridge was thought to be unstable. The builders of the 1753 structure used the original bridge to support scaffolding during construction and added a second arch. The 1901 structure eliminated the slope in the roadway. In 1971, the steelwork and railings were repaired and the bridge was strengthened. The structure was Grade II Listed on 21 January 1964, "as a remarkable succession of three superimposed bridges, one of the best known picturesque sites in Wales" and the listing was updated in 2005.

The word  is Welsh for monk; one theory is that the river got its name from the fact that it was near land owned by a monastery. The first mention of the structure using the English name Devil's Bridge, in historical records, is from 1734.

The bridge is at a point where the River Mynach drops  in five steps down a steep and narrow ravine before it meets the River Rheidol. The set of stone steps, known as Jacob's Ladder, a circular walk for tourists, leads down to a modern metal bridge below the waterfalls.

According to legend, the original bridge was built after an old woman lost her cow and saw it grazing on the other side of the river. The Devil appeared and agreed to build a bridge in return for the soul of the first living thing to cross it. When the bridge was finished, the old woman threw a crust of bread over the river, which her dog crossed the bridge to retrieve, thus becoming the first living thing to cross it. The devil was left with only the soul of the dog.

Tourism and notable sites associated with Devil's Bridge
Devil's Bridge has been a tourist attraction for centuries. Records indicate that tourists were coming to this area by the mid 1700s and that an inn or hotel has existed nearby since before 1796. The area was once part of the Hafod Estate, owned by Thomas Johnes who built a small hunting lodge on the estate which was eventually expanded into an inn. The building burned down and was rebuilt. Significant renovations were completed in 1837–1839 and in the 1860s. After several expansions and upgrades, it has been operated as the Hafod Hotel, using this name since the 1860s. In 2017, new owners had arranged for a survey in preparation for a major renovation; they intended to maintain much of the historical character of the building. Some interior renovation work had been completed by September 2017.

The artist J. M. W. Turner sketched the bridge; this work is at the Tate Gallery, London. He also produced two watercolours of the area in 1795. In 1824, William Wordsworth published a poem, To the Torrent at the Devil’s Bridge, North Wales.

The celebrated English author George Borrow wrote Wild Wales (1854), which includes a lively, humorous account of his visit to Pontarfynach. The George Borrow Hotel, a 17th-century inn where he reputedly stayed, is nearby. Between Devil's Bridge and Pontrhydygroeis Hafod Uchtryd, or Hafod where the hotel is located.

Devil's Bridge is the location of Devil's Bridge railway station, the upper terminus of the historic narrow-gauge Vale of Rheidol Railway, which opened between Aberystwyth and Devil's Bridge in 1902.

Tourism to the area increased after the bridge and the Hafod building were featured in the Hinterland TV series, which has been broadcast in numerous countries. The hotel was presented, using flashbacks, as a children's home that had been closed down and turned into a guest house. Some tourists also enjoy the nearby nature trail, waterfalls and the historic steam railway. Other places of interest and attractions are located a short drive from the area, some in Aberystwyth.

Mary Lloyd Jones (born 1934), a Welsh painter and printmaker based in Aberystwyth was born in Devil's Bridge.

The address for the Devil's Bridge area is Woodlands (referring to the caravan park where free parking is available), Devil's Bridge, Ceredigion, Wales, SY23 3JW. The bridge is on the A4120, with sign posts providing guidance from the village centre.

Popular culture
Devil's Bridge and the hotel building are featured prominently in the opening two episodes of the first series of the 2013 Welsh-language crime noir,  (episodes titled in English "Devil's Bridge" and "Night Music"), shown on S4C and subsequently on BBC4 as Hinterland. Both are featured again in series 3 of the programme. The three series are streamed on Netflix in Canada and the US and also in Japan, Taiwan, India, South Africa, South America, Europe, Australia and New Zealand.

See also
 Coed Rheidol National Nature Reserve
 Devil's Bridge for other bridges of the same name
 List of bridges in Wales

References

External links 

Devil's Bridge, famous thrice over.
Photos of Devil's Bridge and surrounding area
Video footage of the Devil's Bridge and Afon Mynach Gorge

Villages in Ceredigion
Bridges in Ceredigion
Bridges completed in 1901
Bridges completed in 1753
Buildings and structures completed in 1200
Vale of Rheidol Railway
Tourist attractions in Ceredigion
Grade II* listed bridges in Wales
Grade II* listed buildings in Ceredigion
Bridges completed in the 13th century